The Pow-Wow Oak is an historic tree located in the Belvidere neighborhood of Lowell, Massachusetts. ("Belvidere" means "beautiful to behold" in the Italian language.) This 300-year-old tree is believed to have served as a gathering place for pow wows held by the Native American Wamesit tribe. ("Wamesit" is an Algonquian word meaning: "a cornucopia of plenty for all.") The Wamesit Indians congregated in this area for thousands of years, and the land on which this tree grew on (which was high ground with an underground spring close by) was held as sacred to them as was the tree itself. It is also said that Revolutionary War soldiers such as Deacon Thomas Clark, Captain John Trull, and General Joseph Varnum, as well as others from this New England hamlet, traveled past the Pow-Wow Oak on their way to defend Lexington and Concord on Patriots Day, April 19, 1775. This was the very beginning of the American Revolution, which started in the Commonwealth of Massachusetts.

In 1909, Middlesex County decided to pave Clark Road, then a dirt and gravel road that was referred to as "The Old Bridal Path". Albert E. O'Heir, an immigrant from Canada, who lived in the old Hunt Home at 241 Clark Road, did not want to see the tree, which stood in the middle of the road, cut down. In order that the tree might stand, O'Heir donated for one cent to the City of Lowell, 9,463 square feet of his land on Clark Road.

In May 1931, the Molly Varnum Chapter of the Massachusetts Daughters of the American Revolution (DAR) erected a sign next to the tree to commemorate the ancient oak, the Wamesit Indians, and the local militia who passed by it while traveling through that Lowell neighborhood (then still part of the town of Tewksbury) during the Revolutionary War.

In September, 2009, a local, grass-roots, neighborhood, environmental organization called the Pow-Wow Oak Protectors (a registered, non-profit, public-charity), founded by George Nicholas Koumantzelis, was formed to ensure the continued safety of the tree, as it had been encroached upon for decades, doing damage to its health. In May 2011, local groups, including a current chapter of the Old Concord DAR and the Pow-Wow Oak Protectors, raised funds to have the tree's commemorative sign refurbished.  The Pow-Wow Oak has also been recognized and preserved by the American Forests Historic Trees Program, and by the City of Lowell via the Pow Wow Oak Tree Preservation Covenant, which was recorded on March 12, 2012, at the Middlesex (North District) Registry of Deeds, Book 25799, Page 105.

In May 2011, a documentary movie called "The Last Pow-Wow Oak" about the Pow-Wow Oak and the crusade to save it by the Pow-Wow Oak Protectors, as well as other, local, concerned groups, was produced and released by local artist, musician, film maker, and documentarian, Andrew Szava-Kovats. In March 2014, an accompanying book (with the same title) to the movie, including more detailed legal documents and historical data about the whole Pow-Wow Oak saga, was written and produced by Andrew Szava-Kovats.

On May 21, 2013, during a very strong wind storm, a large upper branch (not the lower horizontal "arm" that pointed west) of the Pow-Wow Oak collapsed onto nearby Clark Road. The following day, the decision was made by the City Manager's Office of the City of Lowell to, questionably, cut down the entire tree to the ground because extensive interior decay in the mid to upper sections of the tree had more than partially compromised the tree and the safety of pedestrians and nearby motorists.

On Thursday, November 12, 2015, a dedication ceremony was held at the Peter W. Reilly Elementary School on Douglas Road in Lowell, MA, commemorating the installation of a permanent display of a huge round piece of the trunk of the Pow-Wow Oak.

Gallery

See also 
Lowell, Massachusetts
History of Lowell, Massachusetts

References 

Geography of Lowell, Massachusetts
Individual oak trees
Individual trees in Massachusetts
Pow wows
Religious places of the indigenous peoples of North America
Tourist attractions in Lowell, Massachusetts
Trees in religion
Native American history of Massachusetts